Shergaon is a Gram Panchayat and Sub-division in West Kameng district, Arunachal Pradesh, India. A total of 7 villages comes under Shergaon Gram Panchayat; including Demachang, Jigaon, Mushaksing, Rowta, Shergaon, Tenzingaon, Yokmupam. As per 2011 Census of India, Shergaon sub-division has a population of 3,077 people including 1,628 males and 1,449 females.

Shergaon is a high altitude area. The major population of the area is from Sherdukpen tribe.

References 

Gram panchayats in India
Villages in West Kameng district